The Policeman is a 1971 Israeli feature film, written and directed by satirist Ephraim Kishon. The title character is played by Shaike Ophir (credited as Shay K. Ophir), in what is considered one of his finest performances.

The film was nominated for the 1972 Academy Award for Best Foreign Language Film, and won the Golden Globe Award in the same category. It won several other awards, such as best foreign film in the Barcelona film festival and best director in the Monte Carlo festival. In Israel, it is considered a cinematic classic.

Plot
Officer Avraham Azoulay is a patrolman in Tel Aviv's district of Jaffa. He is an honest man, though extremely naive, and because of his character, has never been promoted during his twenty years in the force. He is married to a dull woman (played by veteran actress Zaharira Harifai); the couple have no children.

His superiors, Captain Levkovich and First Sergeant Bejerano, decide not to renew his contract, though they feel sorry for him. In the meantime, he falls in love with the simple but charming prostitute Mimi, and removes her photograph from the arrests billboard. His wife finds the photo and tears it to pieces, which Azoulay secretly glues together again. Nevertheless, this love will not be realized as Azoulay refuses to divorce his wife, claiming that "it will destroy her". In addition, being a Kohen, he cannot marry a prostitute according to Halakha.

Azoulay shows some success at dispersing a demonstration without resorting to violence because of his knowledge of the Bible and of Yiddish; he also charms a group of visiting French policemen who adore the French-speaking policeman; in an Arab-speaking club house he gives an unaware speech in Arabic. Azoulay is able to see people for what they are and not what they represent. None of these events, however, help to change his superiors' decision to dismiss him. Azoulay forms a friendship with Amar, unaware that he is a notorious criminal. The criminal and his associates decide to fake a crime and allow Azoulay to catch them in the act so that he receives a promotion and regain his contract. They finally decide upon stealing ritual objects, including a large golden cross, from a monastery in the neighbourhood. Azoulay manages to catch the criminal in the act and is finally promoted to the rank of a sergeant, but his contract is not renewed and he is forced to retire from the police.

In the final scene Officer Azoulay leaves the precinct with his new rank and policemen practising marches in the courtyard are being ordered to salute in his direction by Bejerano. The final shot of the film presents Azoulay saluting the marching policemen, thinking that they salute to him, as his eyes fill with tears. This image became one of the most memorable in Israeli cinema.

Cast
 Shaike Ophir as Constable Sgt. Abraham Azoulay
 Zaharira Harifai as Betty Azoulay
 Avner Hizkiyahu as Capt. Lefkowitch
 Itzko Rachamimov as Senior Sgt. Bejerano
 Yosef Shiloach as Amar
 Nitza Saul as Mimi
 Gabi Amrani as The Yemenite
 Arieh Itzhak as Zion
 Abraham Celektar as Cactus
 Efraim Stan as Horovitz

Awards and recognition 
The Policeman is widely considered to be a classic of Israeli cinema. The Film was nominated for the 44th Academy Awards for Best Foreign Language Film, and won the 1972 Golden Globe award for Best Foreign-Language Foreign Film

See also
 List of submissions to the 44th Academy Awards for Best Foreign Language Film
 List of Israeli submissions for the Academy Award for Best Foreign Language Film

References

External links
 

1971 films
1970s Hebrew-language films
Best Foreign Language Film Golden Globe winners
Films directed by Ephraim Kishon
Israeli comedy-drama films
1970s police comedy films
1971 comedy-drama films
Films about prostitution in Israel